Nicole Starosielski is an American author, researcher, and professor. Her research is centered around media infrastructure, particularly underwater infrastructure. She is often interviewed by media outlets as an expert in undersea cables and network infrastructure, especially in relation to national security. Her first book The Undersea Network and online project Surfacing both describe the evolution of underwater cable networks. She also wrote the book Signal Traffic: Critical Studies of Media Infrastructures.

Academic career 
In 2005, Starosielski graduated from the University of Southern California with Bachelor's degrees in Cinema Television and English. She continued her education at University of California, Santa Barbara, earning both a Master's degree and PhD in Film and Media Studies. After completing her degrees, Starosielski became an Assistant Professor of Communication at Miami University for one year. Following this, she began a career as an Associate Professor of Media, Culture, and Communication at New York University Steinhardt where she has taught since 2012.

The Undersea Network and Surfacing 

In her book The Undersea Network Starosielski examines the underwater telecommunications cable infrastructure that allows the internet to operate. The book covers the history of the cables, as well as the geography of the underwater network. In addition, the book discusses the cultural, political, and environmental implications of underwater cable infrastructure. The Undersea Network includes an analysis of the contingencies of the internet as well as information network myths and challenges.

Surfacing is a website designed as a companion to Starosielski's book. The project was developed by Nicole Starosielski, Erik Loyer, and Shane Brennan, with additional writing from Jessica Feldman and Anne Pasek. The website shows non-lineal archival photographs along with text and information about various areas and countries that are connected through the Pacific's underwater cable network. Surfacing also discusses the history of the underwater cable network and some of the modern day challenges of the system.

Works 

 "Things & Movies: DVD Store Culture in Fiji.” (2010) 
 "‘Movements that are Drawn’: A History of Environmental Animation from The Lorax to FernGully to Avatar." (2011)
 "Beaches, Fields, and other Network Environments." (2011)
 "Critical Nodes, Cultural Networks: Re-mapping Guam’s Cable Infrastructure.” (2012) 
 "Warning: Do Not Dig’: Negotiating the Visibility of Critical Infrastructures." (2012) 
 "Beyond Fluidity: A Cultural History of Cinema under Water.” (2012) 
 "Network Archaeology" with Braxton Soderman and Cris Cheek. (2013)
 "Signal Tracks." (2014)
 "The Materiality of Media Heat." (2014)
 Signal Traffic: Critical Studies of Media Infrastructures (2015) 
 The Undersea Network (2015) 
 "In our Wi-Fi world, the internet still depends on undersea cables." (2019)

References

External links

Living people
Year of birth missing (living people)
Steinhardt School of Culture, Education, and Human Development faculty
University of Southern California alumni
University of California, Santa Barbara alumni
21st-century American women writers
American women non-fiction writers
American women academics